Healdtown Comprehensive School is a Methodist school located near Fort Beaufort, Eastern Cape Province, South Africa. It was established in 1855 and assuming its current name in 1994, having been known for most of its history as simply "Healdtown". The founder was John Ayliff, a Wesleyan Methodist missionary from England. It was closed in 1865 and reopened in 1867 as a center for theological and teacher training. In 1880 the theological school was moved to another place, and the Teacher Training School remained. Girls were admitted to study there in 1898. In 1925 a high school course was added. The government took over the school in 1956 due to the Bantu Education Act of 1953. The hostels remained in the hands of the Methodist Church. 761 students used the hostels in 1967.

Prominent former pupils include:
Nelson Mandela (from 1937) and his youngest brother
Robert Sobukwe (1924 - 1978) founded the Pan Africanist Congress (PAC)
Raymond Mhlaba, ANC leader
Archie Mafeje, South African anthropologist and activist.

References 

 Methodist school survives challenges over 150 years
 D. G. L. Cragg: Healdtown Institution. in: Nolan B. Harmon (ed.): The Encyclopedia of World Methodism. The United Methodist Publishing House, Nashville 1974, pp. 1101f
 Nelson Mandela: Long Walk to Freedom. The Autobiography of Nelson Mandela. Abacus, London 2005, pp. 43–50

Schools in the Eastern Cape
Methodist schools in South Africa
Educational institutions established in 1855
1855 establishments in the Cape Colony